Brady Austin (born June 16, 1993) is a Canadian professional ice hockey defenceman. He is currently playing for Kölner Haie in the Deutsche Eishockey Liga (DEL). Austin was selected in the seventh round (193rd overall) of the 2012 NHL Entry Draft by the Buffalo Sabres.

Playing career

Amateur
Austin played major junior hockey in the Ontario Hockey League (OHL) from 2009–10 to 2013–14, collecting 29 goals and 81 assists for 110 points in 322 games.

Austin was drafted by the Erie Otters 30th overall in the 2009 OHL Draft. He was traded to the Belleville Bulls prior to the 2011–12 season in exchange for goaltender Tyson Teichmann. In his fifth year in the OHL, Austin was traded to the London Knights in exchange for Remi Elie.

Professional
On May 29, 2014, the Buffalo Sabres of the National Hockey League signed Austin to a three-year entry level contract. After attending the Sabres training camp, Austin was reassigned to AHL affiliate, the Rochester Americans, to begin his professional career in the 2014–15 season.

During the 2016–17 season, on March 20, 2017, Austin made his NHL debut against the Detroit Red Wings. This was also the final game the Sabres played at Joe Louis Arena.

At the conclusion of his entry-level contract, Austin as a restricted free agent did not receive a qualifying offer from the Sabres, releasing him to free agency on June 26, 2017.

He was given a tryout by the Columbus Blue Jackets prior to the 2017–18 season, but they did not sign him to a contract. He later signed a professional try-out contract with their AHL affiliate, the Cleveland Monsters, to begin the year. On November 11, 2017, it turned into a standard player contract for the rest of the season. While playing with the Monsters, Austin was named to the 2018 AHL All-Star Classic as a replacement for Dean Kukan. In 65 games with the Monsters, Austin recorded career highs with 6 goals, 17 assists and 23 points.

As an unsigned free agent over the summer, Austin received a second successive tryout invitation to attend the Columbus Blue Jackets training camp. He was later released and returned with the Monsters to train before later leaving at the beginning of the 2018–19 season, agreeing to a professional try-out deal with the Stockton Heat, affiliate to the Calgary Flames on October 11, 2018. After appearing in two games, Austin was released from his tryout opting to embark on a European career in agreeing to a one-year contract with Danish club, Esbjerg Energy of the Metal Ligaen on December 2, 2018.

After one season in the Czech Extraliga with Rytíři Kladno, Austin opted to extend his career abroad, agreeing to a one-year contract as a free agent with Russian club, Torpedo Nizhny Novgorod of the Kontinental Hockey League (KHL), on May 18, 2020.

Having claimed the Finnish Liiga championship with Tappara in the 2021–22 season, Austin continued his journeyman European career in signing a one-year contract with German club, Kölner Haie of the DEL, on July 5, 2022.

Career statistics

Awards and honours

References

External links
 

1993 births
Living people
Belleville Bulls players
Buffalo Sabres draft picks
Buffalo Sabres players
Canadian ice hockey defencemen
Cleveland Monsters players
Elmira Jackals (ECHL) players
Erie Otters players
Esbjerg Energy players
Ice hockey people from Ontario
Rytíři Kladno players
London Knights players
Rochester Americans players
Sportspeople from Kawartha Lakes
Stockton Heat players
Tappara players
Torpedo Nizhny Novgorod players
Canadian expatriate ice hockey players in the Czech Republic
Canadian expatriate ice hockey players in the United States
Canadian expatriate ice hockey players in Denmark
Canadian expatriate ice hockey players in Russia
Canadian expatriate ice hockey players in Germany
Canadian expatriate ice hockey players in Finland
Kölner Haie players